Maria Christina "Mia" Brunell Livfors (born 1965) is a Swedish businesswoman. She works as CEO for Axel Johnson AB since June 2015, a private family owned Group of companies focused on trade and retail with a turnover of SEK 66 billion in 2014.

She was previously CEO of publicly listed Investment AB Kinnevik between 2006 and 2014. Prior to that she was CFO of Modern Times Group AB (MTG) between 2001 and 2006, and Before that she worked in Kinnevik and MTG since 1992. She has also worked as a board professional and advisor, and was member of the boards of Tele2 AB, Modern Times Group MTG AB, Millicom International Cellular S.A., CDON Group AB, Transcom Worldwide S.A, H&M AB, BillerudKorsnäs AB, Axel Johnson AB, Metro International SA, Invik & Co AB and  Zalando. She was also chairman of the NGO Reach for Change, which focuses on supporting social entrepreneurs working with children and youth.

Mia Brunell Livfors has studied business administration at Stockholm University between 1985 and 1989.

References

External links 

20th-century Swedish businesswomen
20th-century Swedish businesspeople
1965 births
Living people
21st-century Swedish businesswomen
21st-century Swedish businesspeople